Summit Lake is a lake in the Madawaska Highlands in North Frontenac, Frontenac County, Ontario, Canada, about  northwest of the community of Ompah.

Hydrology
The inflows are Deadbeaver Creek from the south, and an unnamed creek from the north. The primary outflow is an unnamed creek, towards Palmerston Lake, at the east end of the lake, which is controlled by a dam. The waters eventually flow via Conns Creek, the Mississippi River and the Ottawa River into the St. Lawrence River.

See also
List of lakes in Ontario

References

Lakes of Frontenac County